Saint-Brice-en-Coglès (pronounced as Saint-Brice-en-Cogles) is a former commune in the Ille-et-Vilaine department in Brittany in northwestern France. On 1 January 2017, it was merged into the new commune Maen Roch.

Geography
The neighboring communes are Coglès, La Selle-en-Coglès, Saint-Étienne-en-Coglès, Baillé, Saint-Marc-le-Blanc, and Tremblay.

Population
Inhabitants of Saint-Brice-en-Coglès are called briçois in French.

See also
Communes of the Ille-et-Vilaine department

References

External links

 Geography of Brittany
 The page of the commune on infobretagne.com

Former communes of Ille-et-Vilaine